James H. Miller Jr. Electric Generating Plant, also known as Miller Steam Plant or Plant Miller, is a coal-fired electrical generation facility sitting on approximately  in West Jefferson, Alabama.

The plant has four units, the first of which opened in 1978. Additional units commenced operation in 1985, 1989, and 1991, respectively. Each unit has a capacity of 705.5 MWe (660 MWe net). The plant contains two natural draft cooling towers.

The James H. Miller Jr. Plant was cited by The Weather Channel and the Environmental Protection Agency in 2017 as the largest emitter of greenhouse gases in the United States.

See also

Birmingham District
List of largest power stations in the United States

References

External links

Alabama Power
Buildings and structures in Jefferson County, Alabama
Coal-fired power stations in Alabama
Historic American Engineering Record in Alabama